Lorna Gayle is a British actress and singer, known for appearing in the films Run Fatboy Run (2007), The Dark Knight (2008) and One Day (2011). In 2015, she played Shontal in the BBC Three sitcom Fried. As Lorna Gee, she won awards as a lovers rock reggae singer.

Career 
Gayle appeared in films, on television and on stage. Gayle's first audition was for the tap-dancing play Stepping Out. She has also appeared in the West End musical Tina.

Filmography

References

Year of birth missing (living people)
Living people
British television actresses
British film actresses
21st-century British actresses
British people of Grenadian descent